Heiko Niidas (born 15 March 1983 in Tallinn) is an Estonian professional basketball player. He has spent his entire basketball career playing in the Korvpalli Meistriliiga. During the 2007–2008 season, he averaged 16.9 points per game while playing for BC Kraft Mööbel/Kohila. Since 2008, Niidas has been playing for Tallinna Kalev again.

Personal
His sister is married to New Zealand born former Scotland rugby international, PJ Solomon.

1983 births
Living people
Basketball players from Tallinn
Estonian men's basketball players
Korvpalli Meistriliiga players
BC Kalev/Cramo players
BC Tallinn Kalev players
Centers (basketball)